The 2016 Toyota Racing Series was the twelfth running of the Toyota Racing Series, the premier open-wheel motorsport category held in New Zealand. The series, which consisted of fifteen races at five meetings, began on 16 January at Ruapuna Park in Christchurch, and ended on 14 February with the 61st running of the New Zealand Grand Prix, at Manfeild Autocourse in Feilding.

As the first European driver to win the Toyota Racing Series, M2 Competition's Lando Norris wrapped up the championship with a race to spare, amassing six wins, eight poles, five fastest laps, and three round wins on his way to the title. Norris won a race at every meeting, taking a pair of victories in Taupo, while only finishing off the podium four times.

Force India protégé Jehan Daruvala took the runner-up spot in the championship, with one pole and three wins. Daruvala struggled in Ruapuna, but a strategic tyre gamble in a soggy Race 3 paid off, enabling him to take the Lady Wigram Trophy, despite starting 15th. Two further wins followed in Teretonga and Taupo, and solid top-8 finishes in each of the last nine races helped the Indian to second place overall.

New Zealand's Brendon Leitch finished the season in a strong third, despite only one win and three podiums. However, it was his amazing consistency that gave him such a good championship position, as he finished every race in the top 10. Leitch's 754-point haul is also the most points accrued by a Victory Motor Racing driver in team history.

Of the other drivers, Ferdinand Habsburg was top Giles Motorsport driver, after a strong campaign saw him take two wins. Pedro Piquet also took victory on two occasions, first in the second race at Teretonga, and again at Hampton Downs, where a superb run from pole saw him take the NZ Motor Cup. Piquet was often runaway leader Norris's main challenger, both on track and in the standings. Ferrari Driver Academy member Guanyu Zhou scored a breakthrough win in Hampton Downs and finished strongly throughout the duration of the series, although a disastrous final weekend compromised his attack. Rookie Taylor Cockerton was the best-placed ETEC Motorsport driver, finishing in ninth.

Teams and drivers
All teams were New Zealand-registered.

Race calendar and results
The calendar for the series was announced on 23 June 2015, and will be held over five successive weekends in January and February. As opposed to the previous year, all rounds will be triple-headers.

Championship standings
In order for a driver to score championship points, they have to complete at least 75% of the race winner's distance, and be running at the race's completion. All races counted towards the final championship standings.

Scoring system

Drivers' championship

References

External links
 

Toyota Racing Series
Toyota Racing Series